Whitty is a surname. Notable people with the name include:

 Alice Whitty (born 1934), Canadian high jumper
 Allen Whitty (1867–1949), English sport shooter
 Bill Whitty (1886–1974), Australian Test cricketer
 Chris Whitty (born 1966), British physician and epidemiologist
 Dennis Whitty (1941–1963), English convicted murderer
 Edward Michael Whitty (1827–1860), English journalist
 Ernest Whitty (1907–1985), English footballer
 Frank Whitty (1905–2001), Australian rules footballer
 Geoff Whitty (born 1946), British professor at the University of Newcastle, Australia
 George Whitty American musician, composer, producer, and engineer
 Jeff Whitty (born 1971), American playwright
 Jim Whitty (born 1931), American politician from Oregon
 Joseph Whitty (1904-1923), Irish Republican, died on hunger strike
 Larry Whitty, Baron Whitty (born 1943), British Labour Party politician
 Lucinda Whitty (born 1989), Australian sailor
 May Whitty (1865–1948), English stage and film actress
 Michael James Whitty (1795–1873), English newspaper editor and proprietor
 Patrick Whitty (1894–1967), Irish nationalist politician and MP in the House of Commons of the United Kingdom
 Paul Whitty (born 1970) British composer
 Robert Whitty (1817–1895), Irish Jesuit priest
 Rose Whitty (1831–1911), Irish Religious Sister and foundress of convents
 Sophia St John Whitty (1877–1924), Irish woodcarver, teacher, and cooperativist
 Stan Whitty, English rugby league footballer
 Thomas Whitty (1713–1792), English carpet manufacturer
 Mother Vincent Whitty (1819–1892), Irish Religious Sister known for her work in the Australian state of Queensland

See also
 Whitty Street, located in Shek Tong Tsui, Hong Kong
 Witty (disambiguation)
 Witty (surname)